Dodo Chichinadze (28 December 1924 – 3 November 2009) was a Georgian film and theater actress. She appeared in a number of Georgian and Soviet era films, including The Suspended Song, Bashi Achuki,  
The Cricket, and Davit Guramishvili.

Chichinadze appeared as a lead actress at the Kote Marjanishvili Drama Theatre in Tbilisi for approximately 10 years. The Tbilisi city government honored Chichinadze with a star bearing her name outside the Rustaveli Theatre in 2009.

Death
Dodo Chichinadze died on 3 November 2009, aged 84, from undisclosed causes.

References

External links

Filmography  at Georgian National Film Centre

1924 births
2009 deaths
Film actresses from Georgia (country)
Actors from Tbilisi
Place of birth missing
Soviet actresses